The Shagawa River is a river of Minnesota.  The river flows through the east–central part of Morse Township in northern Saint Louis County.

See also
List of rivers of Minnesota

References

External links
Minnesota Watersheds
USGS Hydrologic Unit Map - State of Minnesota (1974)

Rivers of Minnesota
Rivers of St. Louis County, Minnesota